The 1978 Swedish motorcycle Grand Prix was the eighth round of the 1978 Grand Prix motorcycle racing season. It took place on 23 July 1978 at Karlskoga Motorstadion.  This was the 300th race to contribute to the Grand Prix motorcycle racing championship.

500cc classification

350 cc classification

250 cc classification

125 cc classification

References

Swedish motorcycle Grand Prix
Swedish
Motorcycle Grand Prix
Motorcycle Grand Prix